The tenth season of Danse avec les stars, (the French version of Strictly Come Dancing), aired in September 2019 on TF1, and was hosted by Camille Combal and Karine Ferri.

Participants

Scoring 

Red numbers indicate couples with the lowest score for each week.
Blue numbers indicate couples with the highest score for each week.
Green numbers indicate couples who did not dance their second dance for each week.
 indicates couples eliminated that week.
 indicates the returning couple who finished in the bottom two.
 indicates the winning couple.
 indicates the runner-up couple.
 indicates the third place couple.

Highest and lowest scoring performances
The best and worst dance performances according to the judges' marks were:

Couples' Highest and lowest scoring performances
According to the traditional 40-point scale:

Averages 
This table only counts dances scored on the traditional 40-point scale.

Week 1 

 Individual judges scores in the chart below (given in parentheses) appeared in this order from left to right: Patrick Dupond, Shy'm, Chris Marques, Jean-Marc Généreux.

Running order

Week 2 : Love Night 

 Individual judges scores in the chart below (given in parentheses) appeared in this order from left to right: Patrick Dupond, Shy'm, Chris Marques, Jean-Marc Généreux.

Running order

Week 3 : The Judges's challenge 

 Individual judges scores in the chart below (given in parentheses) appeared in this order from left to right: Patrick Dupond, Shy'm, Chris Marques, Jean-Marc Généreux.

Running order

Week 4 : Celine Dion Week 

 Individual judges scores in the chart below (given in parentheses) appeared in this order from left to right: Patrick Dupond, Shy'm, Chris Marques, Jean-Marc Généreux.

Running order

Week 5 : 10 Years Week 

 Individual judges scores in the chart below (given in parentheses) appeared in this order from left to right: Patrick Dupond, Shy'm, Chris Marques, Jean-Marc Généreux.

Running order

Week 6 : Dance with the kids Week 

 Individual judges scores in the chart below (given in parentheses) appeared in this order from left to right: Patrick Dupond, Shy'm, Chris Marques, Jean-Marc Généreux.

Running order

Week 7 : Halloween and Dancers Week 

 Individual judges scores in the chart below (given in parentheses) appeared in this order from left to right: Patrick Dupond, Shy'm, Chris Marques, Jean-Marc Généreux.

Running order

Week 8 : Judges Week 

 Individual judges scores in the chart below (given in parentheses) appeared in this order from left to right: Patrick Dupond, Shy'm, Chris Marques, Jean-Marc Généreux.

Running order

Week 9 : Semi Final 

 Individual judges scores in the chart below (given in parentheses) appeared in this order from left to right: Patrick Dupond, Shy'm, Chris Marques, Jean-Marc Généreux.

Running order

Week 10 : Final 

 Individual judges scores in the chart below (given in parentheses) appeared in this order from left to right: Patrick Dupond, Shy'm, Chris Marques, Jean-Marc Généreux.

Running order

Around the Show

Host
Camille Combal and Karine Ferri returned as the hosts of the show for the second year.

Jury
Chris Marques and Jean-Marc Généreux, remained on the jury, with Shy'm joining for her fourth season as judge and Patrick Dupond for his second season.

Dancers
Professional dancer Marie Denigot was replaced by Inès VanDamme.

Contestant
The first contestant officially announced by TF1 was Liane Foly, on July 19, 2019. Four days later, Linda Hardy officially joined the show as a contestant

Around the Show 
 André Manoukian who did the first season of Danse avec les stars was Liane Foly's ex-husband.
 Linda Hardy was the sixth Miss France to perform on the show.
 Hugo Philip had been dating Caroline Receveur who did the seventh season of Danse avec les stars.
 Sami El Gueddari became the first paralympic contestant and winner of the show

References

Season 10
2019 French television seasons